The Circle Album Chart is a South Korean record chart that ranks the best-selling albums and EPs in South Korea. It is part of the Circle Chart, which launched in February 2010 as the Gaon Chart. The data is compiled by the Ministry of Culture, Sports and Tourism and the Korea Music Content Industry Association based upon weekly/monthly physical album sales by six major South Korean distributors: Kakao Entertainment, SM Entertainment, Sony Music Korea, Warner Music Korea, Universal Music and Stone Music Entertainment.

Weekly charts

Monthly charts

References

External links
 Current Circle Album Chart 

2023
Korea, South albums
2023 in South Korean music